Sultan Saleh Bargash Jaralla Al Menhali (born 18 January 1989) is an Emirati footballer who plays as a midfielder for the UAE Under-20.

Career statistics

Club

1Continental competitions include the AFC Champions League
2Other tournaments include the UAE President Cup and Etisalat Emirates Cup

National team 
As of 27 September 2009

1Continental competitions include the AFC U-19 Championship
2Other tournaments include the FIFA U-20 World Cup

International goals

References

External links
 Al Jazira Club Official site
 Jazrawi
 Al3ankaboot
   Sultan Bargash Profile

1989 births
Living people
Emirati footballers
Al Jazira Club players
Hatta Club players
Baynounah SC players
UAE Pro League players
UAE First Division League players
UAE Second Division League players
Footballers at the 2014 Asian Games
Association football midfielders
Asian Games competitors for the United Arab Emirates